Mitrella monica is a species of sea snail in the family Columbellidae, the dove snails.

Description
The length of the shell attains 5.7 mm.

Distribution
This marine species occurs off Madagascar.

References

 Bozzetti L. (2009). Mitrella monica (Gastropoda: Hypsogastropoda: Columbellidae: Pyreninae) dal Madagascar meridionale. Malacologia Mostra Mondiale 62: 22-23

monica
Gastropods described in 2009